Omar Bakhashwain (born August 7, 1962) is a Saudi Arabian former football player and manager. He played as a forward.

Bakhashwain began his senior career at Al-Ettifaq in 1982 and spent 20 years at the club, winning 8 major titles with the club. He also represented the national team during his playing career. He participated at the 1984 Gulf Cup and the 1984 Summer Olympics.

After retiring in 2002, Bakhashwain was named as the assistant manager of Wim Rijsbergen. He was also named as Zé Mário's assistant following Rijsbergen's sacking. On 16 March 2003, Bakhashwain was named as caretaker until the end of the season following Zé Mário's sacking. Following Jan Versleijen's appointment as Al-Ettifaq's manager, Bakhashwain was once again named as his assistant. He was also named as assistant manager to Versleijen's successor Jorge Habegger. Following Habegger's sacking, Bakhashwain was once again appointed as caretaker, on 4 October 2004. On 14 October 2004, Bakhashwain was once again named assistant manager following Piet Hamberg's appointment. On 30 November 2005, Bakhashwain was named as caretaker following Versleijen's sacking. He was then appointed as assistant following Ednaldo Patricio's hiring. On 1 November 2006, Bakhashwain was named as Al-Ettifaq's manager until the end of the season following Patricio's resignation. On 15 November 2006, Bakhashwain was appointed as Bandar Al-Joathin's assistant in the Saudi Arabia U17 national team. On 30 March 2010, Bakhashwain was appointed as the manager of the Saudi Arabia U17 national team, a position he held for 2 years. On 14 February 2014, Bakhashwain was appointed as Al-Qadsiah's manager. On 3 March 2014, he resigned from his post. On 26 January 2018, Bakhashwain was named as the general manager of the Saudi Arabia national team following Majed Abdullah's resignation.

Managerial statistics

Honours

Player
Al-Ettifaq
Saudi Premier League: 1982–83, 1986–87
King Cup: 1985
Saudi Federation Cup: 1990–91
Arab Club Champions Cup: 1984, 1988
Gulf Club Champions Cup: 1983, 1988

Manager
Saudi Arabia U17
GCC U-17 Championship: 2011, 2012
Arab Cup U-17: 2011

References

External links
Profile at ksa-team.com

1962 births
Living people
Saudi Arabian footballers
Saudi Arabian football managers
Saudi Professional League players
Ettifaq FC players
Saudi Arabia international footballers
Olympic footballers of Saudi Arabia
Footballers at the 1984 Summer Olympics
Association football forwards
Ettifaq FC managers
Al-Qadisiyah FC managers
Saudi Professional League managers
Saudi First Division League managers